Year 379 (CCCLXXIX) was a common year starting on Tuesday (link will display the full calendar) of the Julian calendar. At the time, it was known as the Year of the Consulship of Ausonius and Hermogenianus (or, less frequently, year 1132 Ab urbe condita). The denomination 379 for this year has been used since the early medieval period, when the Anno Domini calendar era became the prevalent method in Europe for naming years.

Events 
 By place 
 Roman Empire 
 January 19 – Emperor Gratian elevates Flavius Theodosius at Sirmium, giving him the title Augustus with power over all the eastern provinces. Theodosius comes to terms with the Visigoths and settles them in the Balkans as military allies (foederati).
 Gratian refuses the title of Eastern Emperor.
 Gratian renounces the title Pontifex Maximus.
 Britain is forced to endure fierce Barbarian raids.

 Europe 
 Niall becomes High King of Ireland.

 Persia 
 King Shapur II, ruler of the Persian Empire, age 70, dies after a 69-year reign in which he conquered Armenia and transferred multitudes of people from the western lands to Susiana (Khuzistan). The great town Nishapur in Khorasan (eastern Parthia) is also founded by him. His brother Ardashir II, governor-king of Adiabene, is placed by the nobles on the throne.

 China 
 Buddhism is declared to be a state religion.
 The War of the Feishui is fought in China.

 Mesoamerica 
 September 13 – Yax Nuun Ayiin (I) becomes ruler of Tikal.

 By topic 
 Religion 
 Gregory Nazianzus becomes Patriarch of Constantinople, and is wounded when he is attacked by a mob of heretics.
 John Chrysostom writes a book on the Christian education of children.

Births 
 Gunderic, king of the Vandals and Alans (d. 428)
 Wang Hong, Chinese politician and general (d. 432)

Deaths 

 January 1 – Basil the Great, bishop of Caesarea Mazaca (b. 330)
 July 19 –  Macrina the Younger, Christian nun and saint (b. 327)
 Shapur II (the Great), ruler of the Sasanian Empire (b. 309)

References